Schmilco is the tenth studio album by Chicago-based alternative rock band Wilco and was released on September 9, 2016. Wilco announced the album on July 19, 2016, and released two songs, "Locator" and "If I Ever Was a Child". The album's announcement came a little more than a year after their previous studio album, Star Wars.

Background and release
In February 2016, Jeff Tweedy first mentioned in an interview that Wilco would be releasing an album in 2016, though did not go into detail. During his solo benefit shows in Chicago later in May, Tweedy said they had finished the new record, but the band wasn't sure they wanted to release it yet. In July 2016, Wilco released "Locator" from the album to commemorate the one-year anniversary of Star Wars and then announced Schmilco several days later, in addition to releasing "If I Ever Was a Child" and "Someone to Lose". In September several days before the release, Wilco had "I Heard Schmilco" events at record stores to promote the album across the country where people could listen to the album and then buy it on vinyl.

The album's name is a nod to the Harry Nilsson album Nilsson Schmilsson. The artwork was created by illustrator Joan Cornellà in collaboration with Stefania Lusini.

On the album, Tweedy tells stories of himself, his family, and his history.

Critical reception

Accolades

Track listing

Personnel
Wilco
 Nels Cline – guitar
 Mikael Jorgensen – keyboard
 Glenn Kotche – drums
 Pat Sansone – guitar, keyboard
 John Stirratt – bass guitar
 Jeff Tweedy – lead vocals, guitar, production

Additional personnel
Joan Cornellà – cover art
 Mark Greenberg – engineering
Bob Ludwig – mastering
Tom Schick – production
 Spencer Tweedy – drums

Charts

Weekly charts

Year-end charts

References

External links

2016 albums
Wilco albums
Albums produced by Jeff Tweedy
DBpm Records albums